Route 434, also known as Conche Road, is a  east–west highway on the Great Northern Peninsula of Newfoundland in the Canadian province of Newfoundland and Labrador. It serves as the only road access to the town of Conche, connecting it with the town of Roddickton and Route 433 (Englee Highway).

Route 434 is a paved, winding, two-lane road through rural hilly terrain for its entire length. There are no other communities or intersections of any kind along Route 434 other than at its two termini.

In 2016, Route 434 was voted second Worst Road in Atlantic Canada by the Canadian Automobile Association's Worst Roads list. This was the third time in six years that Route 434 had made the list.

Major intersections

References

434